Dad's Nuke is a science fiction dark comedy novel  by American writer Marc Laidlaw. It is a parody of middle class suburban life and tells the tale of a nuclear family in the post-nuclear (holocaust) age. The story consists of a series of episodes demonstrating the ridiculousness of the family's sheltered, conformist lives and culminates in the collapse from within of the suburban community. The title refers to a trailer-mounted nuclear missile purchased by the family's father figure, as part of his hostile competition with his next door neighbor.

Kirkus Reviews dismissed the book as "sometimes diverting but more often depressing." Publishers Weekly called it "an inventive and energetic satire, reminiscent of the work of Philip K. Dick."

References

1986 American novels
American science fiction novels